The St. Mark's Parish Church in Denver, Colorado is a historic Episcopal church at 1160 Lincoln Street.  It was built in 1889 and was added to the National Register of Historic Places in 1975.

It was designed by architects Lang & Pugh.  Up to the early 1950s the church "boasted a castellated tower and turret at the front entry. Due to structural problems the upper story of the tower fell: the turret suffered extensive damage and was removed, with a buttress added in its place for support and
aesthetic balance. The architects were Lang and Pugh. Lang was a celebrated architect of the eclectic style in Denver."

References

Gothic Revival church buildings in Colorado
Episcopal church buildings in Colorado
National Register of Historic Places in Denver
Churches on the National Register of Historic Places in Colorado
Churches completed in 1889